Nahuel Alejandro Génez (born 18 June 2003) is an Argentine footballer currently playing as a left-back for Boca Juniors.

International career
Génez was called up to the Argentina national under-20 football team for the 2022 Maurice Revello Tournament in France.

In January 2023, he was once again called up to the national under-20 football team ahead of the 2023 South American Championship.

Career statistics

Club

Notes

References

2003 births
Living people
Footballers from Buenos Aires
Argentine footballers
Argentina youth international footballers
Association football defenders
Argentine Primera División players
Boca Juniors footballers
People from Ezeiza Partido